The 1992 Australian Short Course Swimming Championships were held in Darwin, Northern Territory from 25 to 27 September at Casuarina Pool. They were organised by Australian Swimming.

Medal winners

Men's events

Legend:

Women's events

Legend:

See also
 1992 in swimming
 1992 Australian Swimming Championships

References

Australian Short Course Swimming Championships
Australian Short Course Swimming Championships, 1992
Swimming
Sport in Darwin, Northern Territory
1990s in the Northern Territory